Mohammad Ali Sadjadi  (born 1957, Amol), is an Iranian film director, screenwriter, editor, producer, production designer and writer.

Filmography

References

External links

1957 births
Living people
People from Amol
Iranian film directors
Iranian film producers
Iranian film editors
Iranian production designers
Iranian screenwriters